The 7.39 is a British drama television film that was broadcast in two parts on BBC One on 6 January and 7 January 2014. This romantic drama from Carnival Films was written by David Nicholls.

Plot
Carl Matthews (David Morrissey) commutes by train to London where he works in a property management office under a boss who is pressuring him to dismiss an employee. He has a kind and supportive wife Maggie (Olivia Colman) and two teenage children who he feels do not appreciate him.

One morning he complains to a woman called Sally (Sheridan Smith) that she has taken his seat on the train. He later apologises to her and they start chatting, a relationship develops and she reveals that she is divorced but about to marry again, although scenes with her fiancé (Sean Maguire) suggest she is going cold on the idea. She works at a health club and Carl joins it so that he can see more of her. They fall in love and one evening when the train is not running they spend the night together at a hotel. The second part of the drama deals with the repercussions of their affair.

Cast
 David Morrissey as Carl Matthews
 Sheridan Smith as Sally Thorn
 Olivia Colman as Maggie Matthews
 Sean Maguire as Ryan Cole
 Bill Milner as Adam Matthews
 Izzy Meikle-Small as Charlotte Matthews
Ben Fox as Commuter
Lashana Lynch as Kerry Wright
Justin Salinger as Grant Findlay
 Thomas Morrison as Martin Dawson
 Raj Ghatak as Hotel Receptionist

Production
BBC One announced the series on 29 April 2013. On 1 May 2013 Carnival Films announced that filming had begun. Filming took place on the South West Trains network, including London Waterloo station. The 7.39 was produced by Lynn Horsford, directed by John Alexander and executive produced by Gareth Neame and Sally Woodward Gentle. The original score was by Adrian Johnston.

Reception
Overnight figures showed that the first episode on 6 January 2014 was watched by 22.6% of the viewing audience for that time, with 5.66 million watching it. The second episode on the following day was watched by 23.9% of the viewing audience for the time with 5.77 million watching it.

References

External links
 
 
 The 7.39 Media Pack
 
 Carnival Films: The 7.39 

2014 British television series debuts
2014 British television series endings
2010s British drama television series
2014 romantic drama films
British romantic drama films
BBC television dramas
2010s British television miniseries
English-language television shows
Television shows set in England
Films shot in England
Television shows set in London
Films about adultery in the United Kingdom
Films directed by John Alexander